Postville may also refer to:

Places
Canada
 Postville, Newfoundland and Labrador
United States
 Postville, Iowa
 Postville, Wisconsin

Culture
 Postville: A Clash of Cultures in Heartland America, a religious studies book